Bendeela is a historical locality near the Southern Highlands of New South Wales, Australia, in City of Shoalhaven. It is located to the west of Kangaroo Valley.

Towns of the Southern Highlands (New South Wales)